Full Force Fighting (FFF) is a mixed martial arts (MMA) promotion based in Colorado. The organization's  first event, Full Force Fighting Vol. 1, was held on January 29, 2011 at the Paramount Theater in Denver. The event was co-promoted by Fight To Win and Thomas "Wildman" Denny. Attempting to restore prestige back to combat sports, there was a business casual dress code enforced at the event.

Full Force Fighting Vol. 1

Results

Amateur
Women's  bout: Naylen Schmidt vs. Heather Sachleben
 Sachleben defeated Schmidt by unanimous decision.
Middleweight bout: Tito Solis vs. Brian Scraper
 Solis defeated Scraper by TKO 8 seconds into the second round.
Lightweight bout: Jeff Estrada vs. Jeremy Hastings
 Estrada defeated Hastings by unanimous decision (30-27, 30-27, 30-27).

Professional
Heavyweight bout: Tim Brower vs. Brandon Griffin
 Griffin defeated Brower by TKO 1:19 in the first round.
Lightweight bout: Lorant T Nelson vs. Ricardo McKinney
 Nelson defeated McKinney by TKO 14 seconds into the first round.
Lightweight bout: Josh Cavan vs. Matt McAnachy
 Cavan defeated McAnachy by TKO 4:37 into the second round.
Middleweight bout: Jason Lee vs. Todd Meredith
 Lee defeated Meredith by KO 38 seconds into the first round by a knee strike to the chin.
 bout: Jeremy Kimball vs. Aaron Romero
 Kimball defeated Romero by TKO 51 seconds into the first round.
Middleweight bout: Lumumba Sayers vs. Edward Banks
 Sayers defeated Banks by submission (arm triangle) 2:39 into the first round.
 Light Heavyweight Championship bout: Cody Donovan vs. Xavier Saccamano
 Donovan defeated Saccamano by submission (rear-naked choke) 3:35 into the second round. 
 Lightweight Championship bout: Justin Salas vs. Rob Emerson
 Salas defeated Emerson by unanimous decision (29-28,29-28,29-28).

Current Champions

References

External links 
 

Sports organizations established in 2011
Mixed martial arts organizations